Pim Ligthart (born 16 June 1988, in Hoorn) is a Dutch former professional road bicycle racer, who rode professionally between 2007 and 2008, and also 2011 to 2020, for the KrolStonE Continental Team,  and  teams.

Major results

Track

2004
 2nd  Individual pursuit, National Novice Championships
2005
 National Junior Championships
2nd  Scratch race
3rd  Points race
3rd  Individual pursuit
2006
 National Championships
1st  Points race
1st  Scratch race
2nd  Madison (with Jeff Vermeulen)
 2nd  Madison, UCI Junior World Championships
2007
 National Championships
1st  Points race
2nd  Scratch race
3rd  Madison (with Jeff Vermeulen)
 1st  Omnium, National Under-23 Championships
 UEC European Under-23 Championships
2nd  Points race
2nd  Madison
 3rd Overall UIV Cup
1st Munich
2008
 1st  Points race, 2007–08 UCI Track Cycling World Cup Classics, Copenhagen
 UEC European Under-23 Championships
2nd  Scratch
2nd  Madison
2009
 National Championships
2nd  Madison (with Jeff Vermeulen)
2nd  Scratch race
 2nd Six Days of Tilburg
 3rd  Madison (with Peter Schep), 2008–09 UCI Track Cycling World Cup Classics, Copenhagen
2011
 2nd Six Days of Rotterdam (with Robert Bartko)
2012
 1st Six Days of Amsterdam (with Michael Mørkøv)
2015
 1st  Scratch, National Championships

Road

2006
 2nd Overall Kroz Istru
1st Stage 2
 2nd Omloop der Vlaamse Gewesten
2007
 1st Hel van Voerendaal
2008
 1st Intexstore Race Venhuizen
2009
 1st Stage 2 Tour de Moselle
 3rd Circuit des 2 Provinces
 5th Grand Prix des Marbriers
2010
 2nd ZLM Tour
 3rd La Côte Picarde
 3rd Boucles Catalanes
 6th Arno Wallaard Memorial
2011
 1st  Road race, National Road Championships
 1st Hel van het Mergelland
 3rd Clásica de Almería
 5th Overall Tour of Belgium
1st  Young rider classification
 8th Grote Prijs Beeckman-De Caluwé
2012
 3rd Overall Tour de Wallonie
 6th Clásica de Almería
 7th Hel van het Mergelland
2013
 1st Stage 5 Ster ZLM Toer
 5th Volta Limburg Classic
 10th Clásica de Almería
2014
 1st  Mountains classification Paris–Nice
 9th Overall Tour de Wallonie
 Vuelta a España
 Combativity award Stages 5, 6 & 19
2015
 1st Grand Prix La Marseillaise
 1st Stage 1a Vuelta a Andalucia
 1st  Mountains classification Danmark Rundt
 2nd Binche–Chimay–Binche
 10th Overall Étoile de Bessèges
 10th Paris–Tours
2016
 2nd Grote Prijs Jef Scherens
 4th Cadel Evans Great Ocean Road Race
2017
 5th Eschborn–Frankfurt – Rund um den Finanzplatz
 8th Overall Three Days of De Panne
 9th Overall Four Days of Dunkirk
2018
 3rd Overall Tour des Fjords
 4th Kuurne–Brussels–Kuurne
 5th Trofeo Lloseta–Andratx
 9th Trofeo Serra de Tramuntana
2019 
 1st Ronde van Drenthe

Grand Tour general classification results timeline

See also
 List of Dutch Olympic cyclists

References

External links

1988 births
Living people
Dutch male cyclists
Dutch track cyclists
People from Hoorn
Cyclists at the 2008 Summer Olympics
Olympic cyclists of the Netherlands
UCI Road World Championships cyclists for the Netherlands
European Games competitors for the Netherlands
Cyclists at the 2015 European Games
Cyclists from North Holland
20th-century Dutch people
21st-century Dutch people